The Moldovan National Road Race Championships have been held since 1997.

The winners of each event are awarded with a symbolic cycling jersey featuring red, yellow and blue, the colors of the national flag, which can be worn by the rider at other road race events to show their status as national champion. The champion's stripes can be combined into a sponsored rider's team kit design for this purpose.

Men

See also
Moldovan National Time Trial Championships
National Road Cycling Championships

References

National road cycling championships
Cycle races in Moldova
Recurring sporting events established in 1997
1997 establishments in Moldova